French supercentenarians are citizens, residents or emigrants from France who have attained or surpassed 110 years of age. , the Gerontology Research Group (GRG) had validated the longevity claims of 161 French supercentenarians. France was home to the oldest human being ever whose longevity is well documented, Jeanne Calment, who lived in Arles for her entire life of 122 years and 164 days. The oldest verified Frenchman ever is Maurice Floquet, a veteran of World War I who lived to age 111 years and 320 days across three centuries (1894–2006).

100 oldest French people ever

Biographies

Marie Brémont 
Marie Marthe Augustine Lemaitre Brémont (née Mésange; 25 April 1886 – 6 June 2001) was the oldest recognised person in the world from November 2000 until her death at age 115 years and 42 days. She was born in Noëllet, Maine-et-Loire, on April 25, 1886. Her first husband, railway worker Constant Lemaître, died from his wartime injuries shortly after the end of the First World War. Brémont remarried to a taxi driver, Florentin Brémont, who died in 1967. They had no children. Over the course of her life, she worked as a farmer, a nanny, a seamstress and in a pharmaceutical factory. At 103, she was hit by a car and broke her arm as a result. She died at a retirement home in Candé, Maine-et-Loire.

Germaine Haye 
Germaine Haye (née Germain; 10 October 1888 – 18 April 2002) was France's oldest living person for about a year, following the death of 115-year-old Marie Brémont on 6 June 2001 until her own death at age 113 years and 190 days. At the time of her death, she was the oldest living person in Europe and fourth oldest in the world.

Haye lived in the town of Mortagne-au-Perche in Orne, Normandy, western France, since she was 19 years old. She worked as a babysitter and a teacher until her three daughters grew up and left home. She then devoted herself to literature, publishing poems under the pseudonym Anne Moranget. In 2000, after she fractured her femur, she became reliant on to a wheelchair and went to live in the Mortagne-au-Perche retirement home for the final two years of her life. She died in her sleep.

Camille Loiseau 
Camille Blanche Loiseau (13 February 1892 – 12 August 2006) was the oldest living person in France until her death aged 114 years and 180 days. Loiseau was ranked fifth-oldest in the world in the 2007 edition of Guinness World Records. She was the oldest person ever to share a birthday with another living person, Japanese supercentenarian Toyo Endo.

Loiseau was born in Paris, the youngest of nine children, four boys and five girls. On 13 August 1910, she married René Frédéric Chadal, but divorced him just fifteen days later. Loiseau never married again, and had no children of her own, but helped raise her nephews. She worked as an accountant until 1957.

She was hospitalised in 1998 due to a fall and moved permanently to the Hôpital Paul-Brousse in Villejuif, Val-de-Marne in January 1999. In 2002, aged 110, she was taken on a trip to revisit her native Paris again. She died in hospital, six months after her one-hundred and fourteenth birthday.

Marie-Simone Capony 
Marie-Simone Capony (14 March 1894 – 15 September 2007) was, at age 113, the oldest living person in France. She became the French doyenne following the death of 114-year-old Camille Loiseau in August 2006. At the time of her death, aged 113 years and 185 days, due to heart failure, she ranked as the fifth-oldest person in the world. Capony was born in Charlieu (Loire), and lived in a retirement facility in Cannes. She never married as her fiancé was killed in action at the beginning of the First World War in 1914. Capony was not able to walk since she turned 100, following surgery on a broken femur, but she still remained in fairly good health considering her age.

Marie-Isabelle Diaz  
Marie-Isabelle Diaz (née Rodriguez; 22 February 1898 – 29 October 2011) was posthumously recognised as the oldest living French person from the death of Eugénie Blanchard on 4 November 2010, until her own death a year later. She is also the oldest person ever from the French possession of Réunion. Diaz was born in Sidi Bel Abbès, Algeria, then an overseas territory of France. She was married and had three children. Her husband died aged 60. After Algerian independence, Diaz left her homeland in 1962. She then settled in Spain with one of her sons and lived in Rouen for a few years. Diaz lived in Réunion from 1983 until her death. She was 113 years and 249 days old when she died.

Mathilde Aussant 
Mathilde Aussant (née Gaudet; 27 February 1898 – 23 July 2011) was, at the time of her death, believed to be the oldest verified person in France. However, she was later confirmed as having been the second oldest, when Marie-Isabelle Diaz was verified to have been born a few days earlier than her, on 22 February 1898, and died three months after her.

Aussant was born in Donges, the fifth of eleven children born to François Gaudet and Hélène Halgand. Following the death of her mother, she left Donges for Paris in 1923. She worked as a housekeeper and babysitter. She married a railway worker from Gare Saint-Lazare, who died in 1936. In 1946, she married another railway worker, René Aussant, who died in 1961. Their only child, a daughter, died in 2007, leaving Aussant without any immediate family. In 1999, she moved to a retirement home. In 2008, aged 110, Aussant was awarded the "Medal of the city of Donges". She eventually died at a hospital in the Vendôme region on 23 July 2011, aged 113 years and 146 days.

Notes

References 

 
French
Supercentenarians